The Tower Magazine is a monthly, pro-Israel magazine devoted to long-form journalism about the Middle East.

The Tower is a project of the Israel Project (TIP), launched by its director Peter Block. In 2013, The Forward described TIP under Block's predecessor as having had a reputation as "Israel’s most effective nongovernmental public relations agency."

The Tower Magazine was established in 2013. Founding editor-in-chief David Hazony served until leaving in 2017.

Mark Dubowitz, the CEO of think tank Foundation for Defense of Democracies, describes The Israel Project's publications, of which The Tower Magazine is one, as "unique and credible."

References

External links
 
 16 March 2015 Radio interview with editor about The Tower Magazine

2013 establishments in Washington, D.C.
Monthly magazines published in the United States
English-language magazines
Magazines established in 2013
Magazines published in Washington, D.C.
Open access publications
Zionism in the United States